Suresh Gopalakrishnan from the General Motors Inc., Farmington Hills, MI was named Fellow of the Institute of Electrical and Electronics Engineers (IEEE) in 2012 for contributions to electric drives and control for automotive systems.

References

Fellow Members of the IEEE
Living people
Year of birth missing (living people)
Place of birth missing (living people)
American electrical engineers